The Research and Technology Computing Center  (Centre de calcul recherche et technologie, CCRT) is a supercomputing center in Île-de-France.

The center started operation in 2003 and is part of the CEA scientific computing complex in Bruyères-le-Châtel. It operates the Tera 100 machine, as of July 2011 the fastest supercomputer in Europe with a peak of 1.25 petaFLOPs.

See also
 TOP500
 National Computer Center for Higher Education (France)
 Supercomputing in Europe

References

External links
 Official website

Supercomputer sites
Supercomputers
Science and technology in France
2003 establishments in France